The 1968–69 season was the 70th completed season of The Football League.

Leeds United won the League for the first time in their history, finishing six points ahead of Liverpool. Newly promoted Queens Park Rangers were relegated after finishing bottom along with Leicester City.

Derby County were runaway winners of the Second Division and they were joined in promotion by runners-up Crystal Palace. Despite still boasting the talents of Johnny Haynes and George Cohen, Fulham finished bottom and were relegated. They were joined in the Third Division by perennial strugglers Bury

Watford won the Third Division title on goal average from Swindon Town and both teams were duly promoted. At the bottom end Northampton Town, Hartlepool, Crewe Alexandra and Oldham Athletic were all relegated.

The Fourth Division was won by Doncaster Rovers, who were promoted along with Halifax Town, Rochdale and Bradford City. No team failed re-election so no new members were admitted to the Football League.

Final league tables and results

Beginning with the season 1894–95, clubs finishing level on points were separated according to goal average (goals scored divided by goals conceded), or more properly put, goal ratio. In case one or more teams had the same goal difference, this system favoured those teams who had scored fewer goals. The goal average system was eventually scrapped beginning with the 1976–77 season.

Since the Fourth Division was established in the 1958–59 season, the bottom four teams of that division have been required to apply for re-election.

First Division

Results

Maps

Second Division

Results

Maps

Third Division

Results

Maps

Fourth Division

Results

Maps

See also
1968–69 in English football

References

Ian Laschke: Rothmans Book of Football League Records 1888–89 to 1978–79. Macdonald and Jane’s, London & Sydney, 1980.

 
English Football League seasons